HMS Blossom was an 18-gun  sloop-of-war.  She was built in 1806 and is best known for the 1825–1828 expedition under Captain Beechey to the Pacific Ocean. She explored as far north as Point Barrow, Alaska, the furthest point into the Arctic any non-Inuit had been at the time. She was finally broken up in 1848.

Napoleonic Wars
On 26 February 1808 Blossom was in company with  when they captured Sally and Hetty, William Fleming, Master. Blossom was in company with Jamaica when they recaptured the American brig Iris.

When the schooner realized her mistake a five-hour chase followed before Blossom was able to capture the schooner . Jean Bart was of 147.5 tons (bm) and had been launched in Marseilles only five weeks earlier. She was armed with five 12 and two 6-pounder guns, and had a crew of 106 men under the command of Jean Francis Coulome. She had made no captures but within the previous five days her excellent sailing had enabled her to evade two British frigates and a brig.

Post-war
Blossom was re-rated as a 24-gun sixth rate in February 1817. Between July 1824 and August 1825, she was at Deptford and Woolwich being converted to serve as an exploration ship in "icy seas". In January 1825 Commander Frederick Beechey commissioned her for exploration of the Pacific Northwest.

In 1917 a copper plate was discovered in the Bonin Islands, inscribed with a message claiming the islands as a British possession:

In 1827, Captain Beechey discovered a submerged obstacle in San Francisco Bay, that threatened ships sailing to the young port of San Francisco, California. The rock was previously uncharted, and too large to be removed from the channel by the technology available then. Beechey named the obstacle Blossom Rock, in honour of his ship. Beechey also discovered that two especially prominent giant sequoia trees on the east coast of the bay could serve as a navigational aid to locate the position of the rock, allowing ships to bypass the obstacle and avoid a wreck. This location is marked by California Historical Landmark #962, "Blossom Rock Navigation Trees." In 1870, American military engineers, led by R. S. Williamson, were able to develop technology adequate to remove enough of Blossom Rock to mitigate the hazard to ships.

Blossom was paid off in May 1828. Between April and August 1829, she was at Woolwich being fitted as a survey ship. In May, Richard Owen recommissioned her for the Jamaica station. She remained there until some point in 1832. While she was there the 1-gun schooner  served as Blossoms ship's tender until Monkey wrecked in 1831. The Navy then purchased a second schooner to function as a tender for Blossom, and renamed the tender . The Navy sold Monkey after Blossom returned to Britain in 1832.

Fate
Blossom was hulked as a lazarette at Sheerness in January 1833, and was broken up at Chatham in August 1848.

See also
 European and American voyages of scientific exploration
 Blossom Point, Wrangel Island, named after the ship.

Notes

Sources

References
 
 
 
 Ships of discovery and exploration, by Lincoln P. Paine
 Earliest Records of the Islands Their Discovery by Captain Beechey, H.M.S. Blossom
 Mid-Victorian RN vessel HMS Blossom

External links 

 
 

 

1806 ships
Arctic exploration vessels
Cormorant-class ship-sloops
Survey vessels of the Royal Navy
Victorian-era sloops of the United Kingdom